Greg Colson (born April 23, 1956) is an American artist best known for works that straddle the line between painting and sculpture that address concepts of efficiency and order.  Using scavenged materials, Colson allows the physicality of his makeshift constructions to intrude on the precise systems he paints or draws upon their surfaces - striking a balance between subject and context, image and support, order and chaos.

Biography
Colson was born in Seattle, Washington and grew up in Bakersfield, California, in the nearby suburb of Oildale with his parents and two brothers Doug and Jeff, who is also an artist. His father Lewis Colson was a social worker but was also a skilled mechanic and inventive with makeshift repairs and adapting materials to new uses – which inspired his son's appreciation of the ordinary and the rejected. The industrial environment of the Bakersfield/Oildale area, and its accompanying attitudes and outlook, also affected Colson – particularly in its contrast to the large urban/cultural centers he would later inhabit as an artist.

He received his BA from California State University Bakersfield where he studied with George Ketterl, Ted Kerzie, Michael Heively, and visiting artists John McCracken, Joe Goode, Ed Ruscha, James Turrell, and Ed Moses. From 1978-80 he attended Claremont Graduate School, studying with Tom Wudl, Michael Brewster, and Roland Reiss and earned his MFA.  During the 1980s he apprenticed for artists Vija Celmins, Ruscha, and Wudl. In 1987 he had his first solo exhibition with Angles Gallery. Colson currently works and lives in Venice, California with his wife, writer Dinah Kirgo.

Works

Colson's diagrams and maps speak to the detached, abstract quality of much human analysis, at the same time smuggling social critique into each work.  Roberta Smith of The New York Times described Colson's 1990 debut exhibition at Sperone Westwater Gallery:  "In nearly all of Mr. Colson's works, the combination of modesty and grandiosity, of mental exactness and physical imprecision adds up to an odd, sad beauty.  Elliptical as they are, his pieces often seem to scrutinize the conflict between the active center and deserted margins of industrialized society."

Colson's series of ‘Stick Maps’ of cities such as Cleveland, San Jose, and Baton Rouge are built of found lengths of assorted materials; ski poles, curtain rods, plastic pipe, wood molding – the structure becoming a metaphor for the manifold influences on a city. His constructed ‘Pie Chart’ paintings based on socio-cultural surveys, mock analysis.  Colson's 'Elliptical Models' paintings incorporate, the ordinary and the profound and suggest preposterous hierarchies using the formal through-line of the circle.  Sharon Mizota, in her Los Angeles Times review of Colson's 2010 exhibition at William Griffin Gallery (now Kayne Griffin Corcoran), characterized these works as "grand and hilarious testaments to the leveling effect of data overload.  "One [piece] includes concentric circles depicting ‘5 Steps to Happiness,’ ‘Flea Life Cycle,’ ‘The Cycle of Addiction,’ and for good measure, a flange gasket.  The piece levels the distinctions between these wide-ranging phenomena in an absurdly uninformative information graphic." More recently, Colson has designed and created large-scale outdoor sculptures.

Exhibitions
Colson has had solo exhibitions throughout the United States and Europe, including Sperone Westwater (New York), Patrick Painter Inc. (Los Angeles), Galerie Konrad Fischer (Düsseldorf), Gian Enzo Sperone (Rome), Galleria Cardi (Milan), Kunsthalle Lophem (Bruges, Belgium), Baldwin Gallery (Aspen), Krannert Art Museum (University of Illinois Urbana-Champaign), and the Lannan Museum (Lake Worth, Florida).  Colson's work is in many public collections, including the Whitney Museum of American Art (New York), Metropolitan Museum of Art (New York), Museum of Contemporary Art (Los Angeles), Hirshhorn Museum and Sculpture Garden (Washington, D.C.), Panza Collection (Varese, Italy), Sammlung Rosenkranz (Berlin), and Moderna Museet (Stockholm).

Selected collections

Greg Colson's work is included in collections at the Getty Research Institute, Los Angeles, CA; Hammer Museum, Los Angeles, CA; Henry Art Gallery, Seattle, WA; Hirshhorn Museum and Sculpture Garden, Washington, D.C.; Krannert Art Museum, Urbana-Champaignm Illinois; Los Angeles County Museum of Art, CA; Metropolitan Museum of Art, New York, NY; Moderna Museet, Stockholm, Sweden; Museum of Contemporary Art, Los Angeles, CA; Museum of Contemporary Art, San Diego, CA; Museum of Modern Art, New York, NY; New York Public Library, New York, NY; Panza Collection, Lugano, Switzerland; Sammlung Rosenkranz, Berlin, Germany; Tsaritsino Museum of Contemporary Art, Moscow, Russia; UBS Art Collection, Zurich, Switzerland; Vancouver Art Gallery, British Columbia, Canada; Whitney Museum of American Art, New York, NY.

References

Selected bibliography

Monographs

 Greg Colson, Galleria Cardi, Milan. Essay by Robert Evren, 2001
 Greg Colson, Whale and Star Press. Texts by Pontus Hulten and Peter Wegner, 1999
 Greg Colson, Lannan Museum, Lake Worth, FL. Essay by Bonnie Clearwater, 1988
 Greg Colson: The Architecture of Distraction, Griffin Editions, Los Angeles. Interview with Genevieve Devitt, 2006
 Greg Colson: Krannert Art Museum, University of Illinois. Essay by David Pagel, 1996

Selected books and catalogues
 American Bricolage, Sperone Westwater, New York. Todd Alden, David Leiber and Tom Sachs, 2000
 Mapping, Museum of Modern Art, New York. Essay by Robert Storr, 1994
 Panza: The Legacy of a Collector, Museum of Contemporary Art, Los Angeles. Texts by Kenneth Baker, Cornelia H. Butler, Rebecca Morse and Giuseppe Panza, 1999
 Giuseppe Panza: Memories of a Collector, Abbeville Press, New York. By Giuseppe Panza, 2007
 Gian Enzo Sperone: Torino, Roma, New York, Hopefulmonster Editore, Turin. Texts by Anna Minola, Maria Cristina Mundici, Francesco Poli, Maria Teresa Roberto, 2000
 Sammlung Rosenkranz im Von der Heydt-Museum, Wuppertal, Germany. Texts by Sabine Fehlemann, Peter Frank, Pontus Hulten, 2002

Selected articles
 Maartje Den Breejen. "Intentie en Ongeluk-Als het Leven Zelf." Het PAROOL (Amsterdam), September 6, 2002, p. 11
 David Hunt. "Spotlight:  Greg Colson." Flash Art, November–December 1998, p. 105
 Ken Johnson. “Greg Colson-review.” The New York Times, February 16, 2001, p. B37
 George Melrod. “Greg Colson at Sperone Westwater.” Art in America, September 1994, p. 112
 Sharon Mizota. "Art review: Greg Colson at Griffin." Los Angeles Times, January 30, 2010
 Sally O'Reilly. "Greg Colson at Sprovieri." Time Out (London), January 16, 2002, p. 48
 Tibby Rothman. “Beyond the Image – Interview with Greg Colson” Venice Paper, October 2006
 John Russell. “Greg Colson-review.” The New York Times, January 12, 1990, p. C27
 Jerry Saltz. "Greg Colson: Liberating Materials From Materiality." Flash Art, May–June 1990, p. 150
 Roberta Smith.  “These Are the Faces to Watch.” The New York Times, January 5, 1990, p. C21

External links

 Official Website
 Greg Colson at the Whitney
 Greg Colson at MOCA
 Greg Colson at the Hirshhorn

1956 births
Living people
American contemporary painters
20th-century American painters
American male painters
21st-century American painters
Postmodern artists
Painters from California
Artists from Seattle
Art in Greater Los Angeles
Painters from Washington (state)
Claremont Graduate University alumni
20th-century American sculptors
American male sculptors
20th-century American printmakers
Sculptors from California
Sculptors from Washington (state)
20th-century American male artists